NeueUhren.de is a German-language, digital special interest magazine aimed at those who are interested in mechanical watches and state-of-the-art high-precision technology in the sector of time measurement. It is published exclusively online.

The magazine only provides information about new mechanical watches with price and technical specifications. By using the search options for watch categories (e.g. diving watches, aviator watches, limited edition watch series) and price categories, it is possible to retrieve information selectively. Reports on visiting watch manufacturers as well as background information about watch companies are also part of the editorial topics. It competes with blogs such as Zeigr.com, Herrstrohmsuhrsachen.com and Chronautix.com.

References

External links
 Official website

2012 establishments in Germany
German-language magazines
German websites
Hobby magazines
Magazines established in 2012
Online magazines
Technology websites